Juan Benítez Galeano (born 23 June 1953 in Itacurubí) is a Paraguayan former footballer who played as a defender for clubs from Paraguay, Chile, Ecuador and Spain.

Honours
Atlético Tembetary
 Second Division Championship: 1976

San Lorenzo
 Second Division Championship: 1984

External links
 
 Profile at ABC Digital Profile at

1953 births
Living people
Paraguayan footballers
Association football defenders
Paraguay international footballers
Club Sportivo San Lorenzo footballers
Club Rubio Ñu footballers
Club Guaraní players
Club Sol de América footballers
Club Presidente Hayes footballers
General Caballero Sport Club footballers
C.D. Antofagasta footballers
Paraguayan expatriate footballers
Paraguayan expatriate sportspeople in Chile
Expatriate footballers in Chile
Paraguayan expatriate sportspeople in Spain
Expatriate footballers in Spain
Paraguayan expatriate sportspeople in Ecuador
Expatriate footballers in Ecuador